The Buckskin Lady is a 1957 American Western film directed by Carl K. Hittleman and starring Patricia Medina in the titular role and Richard Denning as her leading man. The supporting cast features Gerald Mohr, Henry Hull, and Hank Worden. The movie's tagline was, She hid her scarlet past behind a pair of silver .45s!

Plot

Drunken Doc Medley (Henry Hull) and his daughter Angie (Patricia Medina) support themselves by Angie's gambling skills as her father steers travelers to her card table. Angie is in the romantic thrall of tough guy Slinger (Gerald Mohr), though Slinger's rough ways bother her. When her father sells his almost non-existent practice to an unwitting Easterner, Dr. Merritt (Richard Denning), Angie sets out to repay the young doctor. Slinger senses the attraction Angie feels for Merritt and decides to make things difficult for both of them, a decision that leads to robbery and murder.

Cast
Patricia Medina as Angela Medley
Richard Denning as Dr. Bruce Merritt
Gerald Mohr as Slinger
Henry Hull as Dr. James Goldsboro ("Doc") Medley
Hank Worden as Lon
Robin Short as Nevada
Richard Reeves as Potter
Dorothy Adams as Mrs. Adams
Frank Sully as Jed
George Cisar as Cranston
Louis Lettieri as Ralphie Adams
Byron Foulger as Jonathan Latham, bank manager
John Dierkes as Swanson
Paul Wexler as Jed

Soundtrack
Robin Short - "The Buckskin Lady" (Music by Albert Glasser, lyrics by Maurice Keller)

External links

1957 films
1957 Western (genre) films
1950s English-language films
American black-and-white films
American Western (genre) films
Films scored by Albert Glasser
United Artists films
Films directed by Carl K. Hittleman
1950s American films